Haliotis midae, known commonly as the South African abalone or the perlemoen abalone, is a species of large sea snail, a marine gastropod mollusk in the family Haliotidae, the abalones. 

It is highly sought after by criminal organizations and a thriving black market exists for it, leading to a catastrophic decline in stocks.

Subspecies 
 Haliotis midae volcanius Patamakanthin & Eng, 2007

Description

"The large shell has a rounded-oval shape and is moderately convex. The distance of the apex from the margin about equals one-fifth the greatest length of the shell. The body whorl is strongly angled at the position of the perforations, perpendicularly descending from the angle to the columellar margin. The surface shows strong, elevated, radiating wrinkles or lamellae, but no spiral markings when adult. The 6 to 11 perforations are small, subcircular, and separated by spaces greater than their own diameter. The two sides are about equally curved. The convexity varies with age. The color of the shell is yellowish-gray. The folds are usually stained with coral-red. The surface is dull, with fine oblique growth-wrinkles and coarse, prominent, less oblique elevated and wavy radiating lamellae. The low spire is composed of about 3 whorls. The body whorl is angulated at the row of perforations. The inner surface is pearly, many-colored, red predominating in young specimens. The muscle-scar is large, rounded, very rough, especially in old shells, which often have coppery stains inside. The columellar plate is rather broad (one-seventh to one-tenth the width of the shell), sloping inward. Its face is a little concave and not at all truncated at the base. The cavity of the spire is large, showing about 1½  whorls from below."

Distribution
Haliotis midae is endemic to the waters off South Africa.

Status 
H. midae is endangered due to severe overfishing from uncontrolled poaching driven by consumer demand in East Asia. Numerous East Asian poaching gangs have created an organized criminal enterprise in conjunction with local criminals and fishers, leading to a catastrophic decline in the species. These organizations are closely linked to the international narcotics trade. In most areas of former abundance, evidence indicates that populations have not been able to keep up with the level of poaching, leading to recruitment failure.

References

  Linnaeus, C. (1758). Systema Naturae per regna tria naturae, secundum classes, ordines, genera, species, cum characteribus, differentiis, synonymis, locis. Editio decima, reformata. Laurentius Salvius: Holmiae. ii, 824 pp

External links
 Franchini P., van der Merwe M. & Roodt-Wilding R. (2011). "Transcriptome characterization of the South African abalone Haliotis midae using sequencing-by-synthesis". BMC Research Notes 4: 59. .
 Roux A., Sandenbergh L. & Roodt-Wilding R. (2008). "Preliminary investigation to determine the cytotoxicity of various cryoprotectants on South African abalone Haliotis midae embryos". Cryobiology 57: 3. .
 

midae
Gastropods described in 1758
Taxa named by Carl Linnaeus